List of Fenerbahçe S.K. records and statistics contains the records and statistics of the footballers of Fenerbahçe.

Domestically, Fenerbahçe has 3 Süper Lig, 1 Turkish Cup and 1 Turkish Super Cup titles. In european cups, the club has 1 Balkans Cup title, and this cup is the first european cup that comes to Turkey.

Honours

European competitions
 Balkans Cup
 Winners (1): 1966–67

Domestic competitions
National Championships
 Turkish Super League
 Winners (19): 1959, 1960–61, 1963–64, 1964–65, 1967–68, 1969–70, 1973–74, 1974–75, 1977–78, 1982–83, 1984–85, 1988–89, 1995–96, 2000–01, 2003–04, 2004–05, 2006–07, 2010–11, 2013–14
 Runners-up (22): 1959–60, 1961–62, 1966–67, 1970–71, 1972–73, 1975–76, 1976–77, 1979–80, 1983–84, 1989–90, 1991–92, 1993–94, 1997–98, 2001–02, 2005–06, 2007–08, 2009–10, 2011–12, 2012–13, 2014–15, 2015–16, 2017–18

 Turkish National Division
 Winners (6) (record): 1937, 1940, 1943, 1945, 1946, 1950
 Runners-up (2): 1944, 1947

 Turkish Football Championship
 Winners (3) (shared-record): 1933, 1935, 1944
 Runners-up (2): 1940, 1947

National Cups
 Turkish Cup
 Winners (6): 1967–68, 1973–74, 1978–79, 1982–83, 2011–12, 2012–13
 Runners-up (11): 1962–63, 1964–65, 1988–89, 1995–96, 2000–01, 2004–05, 2005–06, 2008–09, 2009–10, 2015–16, 2017–18

 Turkish Super Cup
 Winners (9): 1968, 1973, 1975, 1984, 1985, 1990, 2007, 2009, 2014
 Runners-up (9): 1970, 1974, 1978, 1979, 1983, 1989, 1996, 2012, 2013

 Atatürk Cup 
 Winners (2) (record): 1964, 1998

 Prime Minister's Cup 
 Winners (8) (record): 1945, 1946, 1950, 1973, 1980, 1989, 1993, 1998
 Runners-up (7): 1944, 1971, 1976, 1977, 1992, 1994, 1995

 Spor Toto Cup 
 Winners (1): 1967

Regional competitions
 Istanbul Football League 
 Winners (16) (record): 1911–12, 1913–14, 1914–15, 1920–21, 1922–23, 1929–30, 1932–33, 1934–35, 1935–36, 1936–37, 1943–44, 1946–47, 1947–48, 1952–53, 1956–57, 1958–59
 Istanbul Cup
 Winners (1): 1945
 Istanbul Shield
 Winners (4) (record): 1930, 1934, 1938, 1939

Others
 General Harrington Cup
 Winners (1): 1923

 Fleet Cup 
 Winners (4) (record): 1982, 1983, 1984, 1985

 TSYD Cup 
 Winners (12) (shared-record): 1969, 1973, 1975, 1976, 1978, 1979, 1980, 1982, 1985, 1986, 1994, 1995

 TSYD Challenge Cup 
 Winners (2) (record): 1976, 1980

Player records

Most appearances
All official and unofficial competitions are included in the list.

Top goalscorers
All official and unofficial competitions are included in the list.

Managers

First manager: Hüseyin Dalaklı, became the first manager in 1907.
Manager who managed for the longest time: Ignace Molnar, 6 seasons.
Manager who held the most title: Didi and Todor Veselinović, each has 8 titles.

Club records

Goals
Most goals scored in a season: 103 goals (1988–89 season)
Least goals scored in a season: 31 goals (1969–70, 1976–77, 1979–80 seasons)
Most goals conceded in a season: 53 goals (1990–91 season)
Least goals conceded in a season: 6 goals (1969–70 season)

Points
Most points in a season: 93 points (1988–89 season in 36 matches)
Least points in a season: 29 points (1980–81 season in 30 matches)

Matches

First
First Süper Lig match: Fenerbahçe 3–1 Ankaragücü (21 February 1959)
First Turkish Cup match: Adana Demirspor 1–2 Fenerbahçe (30 September 1962)
First european cup match: Fenerbahçe 1–1 Csepel SC (13 September 1959, European Champion Clubs' Cup)

Biggest wins
Biggest Süper Lig win: 8–1 (against Samsunspor and Kayserispor), 7–0 Denizlispor (2 times), Şekerspor, Kayserispor, Hacettepe and Kardemir Karabükspor)
Biggest Turkish Cup win: 10–3 (against Alanyaspor 23 January 2008)
Biggest european cup win: 5–0 (against Turan-Tovuz, UEFA Cup)

Heaviest defeats
Heaviest Süper Lig defeats: 6–1 (against Aydınspor)
Heaviest Turkish Cup defeats: 5–1 (against Galatasaray, Final)
Heaviest european cup defeats: 7–0 (against Benfica, European Champion Clubs' Cup)
Heaviest defeats: 10:1 (against Slavia Praha, friendly match)

National records
Fenerbahçe became champion in 1922–23 season without conceding even 1 goal. 
Became the first champion of Turkish Football League in 1959 which was the first season of the league. 
Won 5 titles in 1967–68 (League championship, Turkish Cup, TSYD, Prime Minister's Cup and Turkish Super Cup). 
Conceded only 6 goals in 1969–70 season. 
In 1988–89, became the team that scores the most goals with 103 goals in 36 matches.
In 1988–89, got the best performance record with 29 wins, 6 draws and 1 defeat and 2.58 points average per a match.
Team whose player is the top scorer in a match. (Tanju Çolak 6 goals, Fenerbahçe 7–1 Karşıyaka, 1992–93 season, week 14)

European records

Best achievements

Statistics

References

Statistics
Turkish football club statistics
Records